The 1992 Asian Football Confederation's Pre-Olympic Tournament was held to determine the three Asian national teams that will participate at the 1992 Summer Olympics.

Round 1

Group A

Group B
All matches played at Hyderabad, India

Group C
All matches played at Manama, Bahrain

Group D

Group E

Group F

Round 2
All matches played in Malaysia.

External links
 Games of the XXV. Olympiad - Football Qualifying Tournament at RSSSF
 Pre Olympic Qualifying Tournament at linguasport.com

Football qualification for the 1992 Summer Olympics
Olympic qualifiers
Olympic qualifiers
1992